Pittsburg USD 250 is a public unified school district headquartered in Pittsburg, Kansas, United States.  The district includes the communities of Pittsburg, Opolis, and nearby rural areas.

Schools
The school district operates the following schools:

Secondary:
 Pittsburg High School
 Pittsburg Community Middle School

Primary:
 Lakeside Elementary School
 Meadowlark Elementary School
 George Nettels Elementary School
 Westside Elementary School

See also
 Kansas State Department of Education
 Kansas State High School Activities Association
 List of high schools in Kansas
 List of unified school districts in Kansas

References

External links
 

School districts in Kansas
Education in Crawford County, Kansas